The Isfayramsay is a river in Kyrgyzstan and Uzbekistan. Its source is in the Alay Range, where it is fed by many glaciers. Due to use for irrigation, it does not reach the Syr Darya anymore, but ends at the Great Fergana Canal north of Fergana. The main settlements along the river Isfayramsay are the city Quvasoy in Uzbekistan, and the villages Üch-Korgon and Maydan in Kyrgyzstan. Its largest tributaries are the Kichik-Alay, Sürmötash, Shibe and Tegermach.

References 

Rivers of Kyrgyzstan
Rivers of Uzbekistan